Pneumoscrotum is a rare medical condition in which gas accumulates in the scrotum. It has a variety of possible causes.

See also 
 Pneumothorax
 Pneumatocele
 Scrotal inflation

References

Urology
Male genital disorders